Denis Vyacheslavovich Dyogtev (born 4 February 1988) is a Russian professional football player. He plays for FC Salyut Belgorod.

Club career
He made his Russian Football National League debut for FC Salyut Belgorod on 16 July 2012 in a game against FC Khimki.

External links
 Career summary by sportbox.ru

1988 births
People from Shebekino
Living people
Russian footballers
FC Salyut Belgorod players
FC Torpedo Moscow players
Association football forwards
FC Energomash Belgorod players
FC Oryol players
Sportspeople from Belgorod Oblast